The Swift Current Gabbro is a formation cropping out in Newfoundland.

Neoproterozoic Newfoundland and Labrador